Ranjae Christian (born December 18, 1977) is an Antiguan footballer who currently plays for Antigua Barracuda FC in the USL Professional Division and the Antigua and Barbuda national team.

Club career
Christian began his career in 2000 with Trinidadian team Joe Public, before moving home to play for Bassa SC in 2002. Christian played for Bassa in the Antigua and Barbuda Premier Division for nearly a decade, and while playing with Bassa he won five league titles (in 2004, 2005, 2007, 2008 and 2010), two Antigua and Barbuda FA Cup titles in 2008 and 2010, and was the league's top scorer in 2007 with 15 goals. He has also won 1 MVP trophy for the Antigua and Barbuda Premier division in 2007. He also played in the CFU Club Championship on three occasions, reaching the quarter finals of the competition in both 2005 and 2007.

In 2011 Christian transferred to the new Antigua Barracuda FC team prior to its first season in the USL Professional Division. He made his debut for the Barracudas on April 27, 2011 in a 7-0 victory over Puerto Rico United, scoring his team's 7th goal in the 78th minute of the game.

Personal life
Christian has one son named after him, he is also a part of the "Dumz Tree Family" association

International career
Christian made his debut for the Antigua and Barbuda national team in 2000. He represented his country in qualification for the 2002, 2006 and 2010 FIFA World Cups, and was part of the Antigua squad which took part in the final stages of the 2010 Caribbean Championship.

National team statistics

International goals
Scores and results list Antigua and Barbuda's goal tally first.

References

External links

1977 births
Living people
Antigua and Barbuda footballers
Antigua and Barbuda expatriate footballers
Antigua and Barbuda international footballers
Joe Public F.C. players
Antigua Barracuda F.C. players
Expatriate footballers in Trinidad and Tobago
Antigua and Barbuda expatriate sportspeople in Trinidad and Tobago
TT Pro League players
Association football defenders
USL Championship players